Jennifer "DJ" Nordquist is a public policy expert who served as the U.S. Executive Director of the World Bank,  representing the U.S. as the largest shareholder at the International Bank for Reconstruction and Development, International Development Association, International Finance Corporation, and Multilateral Investment Guarantee Agency. At the Bank, she focused on the COVID-19 response, oversight, information and communication technology, energy, debt, human capital, and gender. Prior to her role at the Bank, Nordquist was the Chief of Staff at the Council of Economic Advisers at the White House. She is currently the Executive Vice President of the Economic Innovation Group, is an independent director at Sunlight Financial (SUNL), serves on the advisory board of Big Sun Holdings, is a Fellow at the University of Virginia Darden School of Business, is a Senior Adviser at the Center for Strategic and International Studies  and is on the advisory board at ClearPath

Biography

A graduate of the Chapin School in New York City, Nordquist received her Bachelor of Arts from Stanford University and her Master of Science in journalism from Northwestern University.
 
From 2008 to 2017, Nordquist served as Chief of Staff of the Brookings Institution’s Economic Studies program.
 
She formerly served under several roles during the administration of George W. Bush, including as  Assistant Secretary at the U.S. Department of Housing and Urban Development, a senior advisor in the Office of the Federal Coordinator for Gulf Coast Rebuilding, Deputy Chief of Staff at the Federal Deposit Insurance Corporation, and as Acting Director and Deputy Assistant Secretary at the U.S. Department of Education.

Nordquist served as the Chief of Staff at the Council of Economic Advisers under Chairman Kevin Hassett from 2017 to 2019. During this time, she also served as a member of the Presidential Delegation to attend the Peace to Prosperity Workshop in Manama, Bahrain.

She received the Secretary of the Treasury's Distinguished Service Award and was named a Stanford Associate by the Stanford Board of Governors for outstanding alumni volunteer service.  She is also on the Board of Directors of Gadsby's Tavern Museum in Alexandria, Virginia.

United States Executive Director for the World Bank

On March 8, 2019, President Donald Trump nominated her to position of the United States Executive Director of the World Bank. The Senate confirmed her to the position on September 12, 2019. Nordquist also served on the Audit Committee, the Committee on Governance, and the Committee on Development Effectiveness at the World Bank. As U.S. Executive Director, Nordquist was also on the Boards of the International Bank for Reconstruction and Development (IBRD), International Development Association (IDA), International Finance Corporation (IFC) and Directors to the Board of the Multilateral Investment Guarantee Agency (MIGA).

Nordquist's work included representing the World Bank Group at international events, such as visiting developing nations to determine how the World Bank could encourage economic development  or representing the World Bank at industry group events. Nordquist also worked with the President of the World Bank Group, David Malpass, on issues related to the U.S. government, economy, and financial services industry.

References

Stanford University alumni
Northwestern University alumni
Living people
World Bank people
Trump administration personnel
Year of birth missing (living people)